Russia competed at the 2000 Summer Olympics in Sydney, Australia. 435 competitors, 241 men and 194 women, took part in 238 events in 30 sports.

As of 2021, this is Russia's best ever result in terms of gold medals and the second best in terms of overall medals (after 2004).

Medalists

Results by event

Archery

The Russian men came close to winning their first medal since beginning to compete individually when they won their semifinal in the team round and tied the United States in the bronze medal match. However, in the three-arrow tie-breaker, the Americans scored a 29 to the Russians' 26 to prevent them from winning a medal.

Men

Women

Athletics

Men

Women

Badminton

Women

Basketball

Men's team

|}
| valign="top" |
 Head coach

Legend
(C) Team captain
nat field describes country of last club  before the tournament
Age field is age on 17 September 2000
|}

Preliminary round

Quarterfinal

Classification 7-8

Women's team

|}
| valign="top" |
 Head coach

Legend
(C) Team captain
nat field describes country of last club  before the tournament
Age field is age on 16 September 2000
|}

Preliminary round

Quarterfinal

Classification 5-6

Boxing

Canoeing

Flatwater

Men

Women

Cycling

Mountain biking

Men

Women

Road
Men

Women

Track
Sprints

Pursuits

Time trials

Points Races

Diving

Russia competed in all of the diving events at the 2000 Sydney Olympics and won two gold medals, one silver medal and two bronze medals. 
Men

Women

Equestrian
 
 
Dressage

Fencing

Men

Women

Gymnastics

Artistic 
Men

Women

Rhythmic

Trampoline

Handball

Men's team

|}
| valign="top" |
 Head coach

Legend
nat field describes country of last club before the tournament
Age field is age on 16 September 2000
Position
-G: Goalkeeper 
-P: Pivot 
-CB: Centre Back 
-LW: Left Wing 
-RW: Right Wing 
-LB: Left Back 
-RB: Right Back 

References
 (1)
|}
Preliminary round

Quarterfinals

Semifinals

Final

Judo 

Men

Women

Modern pentathlon 

Men

Rowing 

Men

Women

Sailing 

Russia competed in seven Sailing events at the 2000 Sydney Olympics, but they never scored higher than 6-th.

Men

Women

Open

Shooting 

Men

Women

Swimming 

Men

Women

Synchronized swimming

Table tennis 

Women

Taekwondo 

Men

Women

Tennis 

Men

Women

Triathlon 

Women

Volleyball

Beach

Men

Indoor
Men's team

 Head coach: Gennadiy Shipulin
Preliminary round

Quarterfinals

Semifinals

Final

Women's team

 Head coach: Nikolay Karpol
Preliminary round

Quarterfinals

Semifinals

Final

Water polo 

Men's team
Roman Balashov, Dmitri Douguine, Alexander Yerishev, Serguei Garbouzov, Dmitry Gorshkov, Yuri Yatsev, Nikolay Kozlov, Nikolai Maximov, Andrei Reketchinski, Dmitri Stratan, Revaz Tchomakhidze, Marat Zakirov, Irek Zinnourov
Preliminary round

Quarterfinals

Semifinals

Final

Women's team
Marina Akobiya, Ekaterina Anikeeva, Sofia Konukh, Maria Koroleva, Natalia Kutuzova, Svetlana Kuzina, Yuliya Petrova, Tatiana Petrova, Galina Rytova, Elena Smurova, Elena Tokun, Irina Tolkunova, Ekaterina Vasilieva
Preliminary round

Semifinals

Bronze Medal Match

Weightlifting 

Men

Women

Wrestling 

Men's Freestyle

Men's Greco-Roman

Notes

Wallechinsky, David (2004). The Complete Book of the Summer Olympics (Athens 2004 Edition). Toronto, Canada. .
International Olympic Committee (2001). The Results. Retrieved 12 November 2005.
Sydney Organising Committee for the Olympic Games (2001). Official Report of the XXVII Olympiad Volume 1: Preparing for the Games. Retrieved 20 November 2005.
Sydney Organising Committee for the Olympic Games (2001). Official Report of the XXVII Olympiad Volume 2: Celebrating the Games. Retrieved 20 November 2005.
Sydney Organising Committee for the Olympic Games (2001). The Results. Retrieved 20 November 2005.
International Olympic Committee Web Site

References

Nations at the 2000 Summer Olympics
2000
Summer Olympics